The 1989 Snooker World Cup was a team snooker tournament played at the Bournemouth International Centre.

England went on to win their record fourth title with the same players from last year Steve Davis, Jimmy White and Neal Foulds beat a Rest of the World team with South Africa's Silvino Francisco, New Zealand's Dene O'Kane and Malta's Tony Drago who were 5-8 behind to finish in a final frame encounter between Davis and O'Kane which ended in a re-spotted black.
 


Main draw

Teams

Final

References

World Cup (snooker)
World Cup
World Cup (snooker)